Hassan Khan may refer to:

 Hassan Khan (politician) (born 1936), Indian politician from Ladakh
 Hassan Khan (artist) (born 1975), British-born Egyptian multimedia artist, musician, and writer
 Hassan Khan (cricketer) (born 1998), Pakistani crickete
 Gul Hassan Khan (1921–1999), Pakistani former army commander-in-chief

See also
 Hasan Khan (disambiguation)